Woronoff's ring is a skin condition characterized by a blanched halo of approximately uniform width surrounding psoriatic lesions after phototherapy or topical treatments.

See also 
 Psoriasis
 List of cutaneous conditions

References 

Disturbances of human pigmentation